Yuka Ichiguchi (市口侑果, Ichiguchi Yūka) is a Japanese softball player who plays as a infielder. She helped Japan qualify for the 2020 Summer Olympics.

Playing career
She participated at the 2013 Softball World Cup and 2018 Women's Softball World Championship.

She plays for the Bic Camera Queen Bees.

References

External links
Kanagawa, Japan. 6 September 2020. Yuka Ichiguchi (Bee Queen) Softball 
WBSC Women's Softball World Championship - Day 8

Living people
1992 births
Japanese softball players
Asian Games medalists in softball
Asian Games gold medalists for Japan
Medalists at the 2014 Asian Games
Medalists at the 2018 Asian Games
Medalists at the 2020 Summer Olympics
Olympic gold medalists for Japan
Olympic softball players of Japan
Olympic medalists in softball
Softball players at the 2014 Asian Games
Softball players at the 2018 Asian Games
Softball players at the 2020 Summer Olympics
Competitors at the 2022 World Games
World Games silver medalists
World Games medalists in softball
21st-century Japanese women